In linguistics, a clipped compound is a word produced from a compound word by reducing its parts while retaining the meaning of the original compound. It is a special case of word formation called clipping.

Clipped compounds are common in various slang and jargon vocabularies.

A clipped compound word is actually a type of blend word. Like other blends, clipped compounds may be made of two or more components. However, a blend may have a meaning independent of its components' meanings (e.g., motel <— motor + hotel), while in a clipped compound the components already serve the function of producing a compound meaning (for instance, pulmotor <— pulmonary + motor). In addition, a clipped compound may drop one component completely: hard instead of hard labor, or mother for motherfucker (a process called ellipsis). Laurie Bauer suggests the following distinction: If the word has compound stress, it is a clipped compound; if it has single-word stress, it is a blend.

The meaning of clipped compound may overlap with that of acronym, especially with compounds made of short components. 

In the Russian language, a clipped compound may acquire one or more extra suffixes that indicate the intended grammatical form of the formed word. In particular, the suffix -k is commonly used, for example, in askorbinka (from askorbinovaya kislota (i.e., ascorbic acid)).

In Japanese, clipped compounds are very commonly used to shorten long, either coined or wholly borrowed, compounds (see also Japanese phonology and transcription into Japanese). For instance, a word processor (ワードプロセッサ wādo purosessa) may be referred to as simply ワープロ wāpuro, sexual harassment (セクシャルハラスメント sekusharu harasumento) as セクハラ sekuhara, the program Clip Studio Paint (クリップスタジオペイント Kurippu Sutajio Peinto) as クリスタ Kurisuta, the video game series Monster Hunter (モンスターハンター Monsutā Hantā) as モンハン Monhan, the United Nations (国際連合 Kokusai Rengō) as 国連 Kokuren, and the Soviet Union (ソビエト連邦 Sobieto Renpō) as ソ連 Soren.

Clipped compound place names 
Clipped compounds are sometimes used in place names.

 English: The Delmarva Peninsula is named for the US states of Delaware, Maryland, and Virginia (from the traditional abbreviation Va.). Several Manhattan neighborhoods are clipped compounds including  Soho ("South of Houston"), Noho ("North of Houston"), Tribeca ("Triangle Below Canal Street"), Nolita ("North of Little Italy") and Nomad ("North of Madison Square").
 Chinese: The Chinese city of Wuhan takes its name from a clipped compound of the "Three Towns of Wuhan": Wuchang contributes "Wu", whereas Hankou and Hanyang both contribute "Han."
 Japanese: In Japanese, city names are often combined in a clipped compound with alternative readings of the characters, especially for combined regions or for train lines between cities. Most often the kan-on readings (most common readings in kanji compounds) are used for the compounds, while the place names use other readings. The larger region, including , is similarly called , the go-on reading  replacing the kun'yomi .
 Hebrew: In Hebrew, the word רמזור (traffic light) is made of the two words רמז (hint) and אור (light).
 Multi-lingual: The Benelux Union takes its name from its component nations, Belgium, Netherlands, and Luxembourg.
 The African country Tanzania has a name that combines the names of the two states that unified to create the country: Tanganyika and Zanzibar.

See also
 Portmanteau
 Syllabic abbreviation

References

Further reading
Denis Jamet, A morphophonological approach to clipping in English  Can the study of clipping be formalized?

Word coinage